Magical Village is a 2017 Burmese thriller television series. It is based on the popular novel "Magical Village" written by Thoe Saung. It aired on MRTV-4, from September 14 to October 18, 2017, on Mondays to Fridays at 19:15 for 25 episodes.

Cast
Kyaw Thu as U Mar Ga
Aung Min Khant as Yo Sit
Nan Sandar Hla Htun as Yay Wadi
Chue Lay as Sein War
Thu Riya as Elit
Kaung Sett Naing as Htun Oo
Yan Naing Soe as Phoe Aung
Zin Cho Khine Oo as Than Khin
Shwe Zin Wint Shein as Htwe Mya
Mike Mike as Phoe Si
Htet Myat as Than Khae

References

Burmese television series
MRTV (TV network) original programming